Baron de Sigognac is an Armagnac brand produced by the Domaine de Bordeneuve company.

Awards
 Craft Armagnac Producer of the Year 2018, 2019, 2020 & 2021
 Best Artisanal Armagnac of the Year, 2019 & 2020: Baron de Sigognac 10 Ans d'Âge Excellence 
 Best Craft Armagnac collection 2021: Baron de Sigognac
 Best Independent Craft Distillery South-West France 2021 (EU Business News Initiative Awards).
 Beverage Testing Institute of Chicago
 International Spirits Challenge of London
 International Wine & Spirit Competition of London
 Bruxelles Competition

External links
 Armagnac Baron de Sigognac
 Eaux-de-vie from France

Brandies
Armagnac